This list of museums in East Sussex, England contains museums which are defined for this context as institutions (including nonprofit organizations, government entities, and private businesses) that collect and care for objects of cultural, artistic, scientific, or historical interest and make their collections or related exhibits available for public viewing. Also included are non-profit art galleries and university art galleries.  Museums that exist only in cyberspace (i.e., virtual museums) are not included.

Museums

Defunct museums
 Musgrave Museum, Eastbourne, life of St. Paul
 Yesterday's World, Battle, closed in 2015

References

 Sussex Museums Group
 Museums and Art Galleries - East Sussex County Council

See also
 Visitor attractions in East Sussex

 
East Sussex
Museums